is a former Japanese football player.

Playing career
Ishii was born in Fujieda on January 19, 1978. After graduating from Shizuoka Gakuen High School, he joined J1 League club Urawa Reds in 1996. He became a regular player as defensive midfielder in 1998. Although he played many matches for a long time, his opportunity to play decreased in 2002. In 2003, he moved to Vegalta Sendai. Although he played as regular player in 2003, his opportunity to play decreased in 2004. In 2005, he moved to Kyoto Purple Sanga (later Kyoto Sanga FC). Although he could not play many matches until early 2006, he became a regular player from late 2006. However the club gains many players in 2008 and he could hardly play in the match behind new member Yuto Sato and Sidiclei. In 2009, he moved to Roasso Kumamoto. Although he played as regular player, he was released for generational change end of 2009 season. In 2010, he moved to his local club Fujieda MYFC in Regional Leagues. He played as regular player and the club was promoted to Japan Football League from 2012. He retired end of 2013 season.

Club statistics

References

External links

1978 births
Living people
Association football people from Shizuoka Prefecture
Japanese footballers
J1 League players
J2 League players
Japan Football League players
Urawa Red Diamonds players
Vegalta Sendai players
Kyoto Sanga FC players
Roasso Kumamoto players
Fujieda MYFC players
Footballers at the 1998 Asian Games
Association football midfielders
Asian Games competitors for Japan
People from Fujieda, Shizuoka